Indomodulus tectum is a species of small sea snail, a marine gastropod mollusk in the family Modulidae.

References

 Lamarck J.B. (1816). Liste des objets représentés dans les planches de cette livraison. In: Tableau encyclopédique et méthodique des trois règnes de la Nature. Mollusques et Polypes divers. Agasse, Paris. 16 pp.
 Landau B., Vermeij G. K. & Reich S. (2014). Classification of the Modulidae (Caenogastropoda, Cerithioidea), with new genera and new fossil species from the Neogene of tropical America and Indonesia. Basteria. 78(1-3): 1-29.

External links
 Gmelin J.F. (1791). Vermes. In: Gmelin J.F. (Ed.) Caroli a Linnaei Systema Naturae per Regna Tria Naturae, Ed. 13. Tome 1(6). G.E. Beer, Lipsiae
 Petit de la Saussaye S. (1853). Notice sur le genre Modulus, avec la liste des espèces appartenant à ce genre. Journal de Conchyliologie. 4: 132-137
 https://www.biodiversitylibrary.org/page/15974292
 

Modulidae
Gastropods described in 1791